Byron Cowart (born May 20, 1996) is an American football defensive tackle who is a free agent. He played college football at Maryland and Auburn and was drafted by the Patriots in the fifth round of the 2019 NFL Draft. Entering college, he was regarded as the #1 overall recruit by ESPN and Rivals.

College career
Cowart was the #1 high school recruit and committed to  Auburn in 2015. However he struggled to get playing time in his first two seasons. After appearing in the team's first two games, Cowart left Auburn early in the 2017 season and attended Hillsborough Community College (HCC) near his Florida home. In December he announced he was transferring to Maryland for the 2018 season.

Professional career

New England Patriots
Cowart was drafted by the New England Patriots in the fifth round (159th overall) of the 2019 NFL Draft. He played in five games as a rookie.

Cowart was placed on the reserve/COVID-19 list by the team on October 12, 2020, and was activated on October 21.

In Week 14 of the 2020 season against the Los Angeles Rams on Thursday Night Football, Cowart recorded his first career sack on Jared Goff during the 24–3 loss.

On August 31, 2021, Cowart was placed on the reserve/physically unable to perform list to start the season. On July 22, 2022, the Patriots waived Cowart.

Indianapolis Colts
On July 23, 2022, Cowart was claimed by the Indianapolis Colts.

References

External links
Maryland bio
New England Patriots bio

1996 births
Living people
People from Seffner, Florida
Players of American football from Tampa, Florida
American football defensive tackles
Auburn Tigers football players
Maryland Terrapins football players
New England Patriots players
Indianapolis Colts players